Blacksburg Tactical Research Center (BTRC) is an American game publishing company best known for the TimeLords, Macho Women with Guns, and EABA role-playing games. They have produced a variety of role-playing games, card games, and board games. Since 2003, they have published exclusively in PDF format.

History
 
While a student at Virginia Tech in the early 1980s, Greg Porter designed several role playing and board games as part of the school's wargaming club. He approached numerous game companies about publishing his designs, but after multiple rejections decided to start his own company. He founded BTRC in 1985, in Blacksburg, Virginia. Greg decided early on that he did not want the company to take on large amounts of debt to release or promote products, so the first games saw very limited releases. Its first product was a board game, Concrete Jungle, a modern tactical game of small-unit military and police actions. TimeLords was its first role-playing game product, released in 1987. It did not initially sell well, but maintained a cult following that allowed a second edition to be published in 1990, followed by a number of supplements. The 1988 release of Macho Women with Guns saw unexpected success and several printings, and allowed the company to continue and expand its line of role-playing game products.

In the 90s, the company shifted its focus to generic role playing game systems, first with CORPS, followed by their flagship system EABA in 2003. With the creation of EABA, they moved to release games exclusively in PDF format, either through online download or print on demand. This allowed BTRC to produce more games and continually update them without reprinting new versions every time, but also limited their reach into game stores and slowed sales. The move to PDF only also allows their games to use many of the built in features of the PDF format across any platform, such as automated dice rolling, live links, and mapping.  BTRC's work has been called "the bleeding edge of PDF game development",

Published games

Role Playing Games
TimeLords, 1987
SpaceTime, 1988
Macho Women with Guns, 1988
CORPS, 1990
WarpWorld, 1991
Epiphany: The Legends of Hyperborea, 1996. Experimental diceless open sourced system and setting.
EABA, generic role playing system, 2003
Hollyworld, 2005
Purgatory Bay, 2011
EABA v2, 2012
Epiphany 2e, 2021. Reworking of the original Epiphany system, no longer diceless.

Game Supplements
Guns! Guns! Guns!, 1991.  Firearms design rules for any role-playing game.
Stuff! 2006.  EABA based item design tool for any role-playing game.  Nominated for the 2006 Ennie award,

Board Games
Concrete Jungle, 1985 
The Con Game, 1989 
Black Death, 1993 
Slag, 1995 
End of Days, 2008 
Soft Landing, 2009
Hunted, 2017
Black Death 2.0, 2021

Card Games
F*CK This!, rude and crude card game, 2004 
Dumbass!, less rude card game, 2006 
Infinite Armies, 2005, winner of 2006 Origins Vanguard award
Footsteps of the Prophet, 2008 
Alien Zombie Tentacle Apocalypse, 2010
Donner Party, 2016 
Killing Lee Garvin, 2019 
Badass Zombie Killers, 2020
Artistes Miserables, 2022

Experimental Games
Posturing and Pretentions, 2002. Satirical role playing game
EBON, 2006.  A complete role-playing game that fits on a single sheet of paper.
Tag!, 2020. Intended for game conventions, each player's convention name tag is their game piece.

References

Gamewyrd: Interview with Greg Porter, retrieved November 27, 2006
e23: Publisher Information: BTRC, retrieved November 27, 2006
Blacksburg Tactical Research Center web site

Role-playing game publishing companies